Wright's Pies (Shelton) Ltd. is a manufacturer of baked goods and confectionery based in Stoke-on-Trent, England.  Wrights Food Group was bought by The Compleat Food Group in December 2021.

History 
The company was founded in 1926 by John James Wright making pies from the front room of his terraced house in Stoke-on-Trent. The company now operates three manufacturing sites situated in Crewe and remained family owned until December 2021 when it was sold for an undisclosed amount to The Compleat Food Group.

Retail 
Wright's have 15 retail outlets.
Longton, Stoke Town Centre, College Road Shelton, Northwood, Stoke, Burslem, Tunstall, Rugeley, Newcastle-under-Lyme, Hanley, Fenton, Meir, Leek, Kidsgrove, Chell & Wolstanton.

Wholesale 
Wright's operates a fresh wholesale delivery service operating from Crewe. Deliveries can be made to Manchester, North Wales, Derby and Birmingham. Freshly baked pies & savouries, confectionery and sandwiches are available Monday to Friday

Frozen 
Wright's also have a frozen food delivery operation with the option of ready baked frozen products or frozen un-baked products which can be baked as needed. Wright's exports to over 26 countries.

The company is capable of producing over 5 million individual items every week.

References

External links 

Bakeries of the United Kingdom
British pie brands
Companies based in Stoke-on-Trent
British companies established in 1926
Privately held companies of the United Kingdom
Food and drink companies established in 1926